Martin "Marthus" Škaroupka (born 20 January 1981) is a Czech extreme metal drummer. He is a member and songwriter in the British extreme metal band Cradle of Filth.

Biography
When he was 6, Škaroupka started attending piano and singing lessons at LŠU Brno until he was 13. Because there were no drums lessons at any of the music schools of that time available, he began to take private lessons from prof. Cupák (member of Janáček opera in Brno).

When he was 15 years old, Škaroupka was admitted to Leoš Janáček Conservatory Brno, where he graduated in drums and piano.

Marthus began playing with various bands of various music styles when he was 15. In the same year, his first studio enterprise is released with the band Animal Farm, which was followed by another studio CD with the band Pink Chubby Cigar.

In 1997 Marthus and his long-time friend Khaablus founded the band Inner Fear, where Marthus was responsible for all compositions, keyboards and drums. In the same year the first demo came out and by 2003 two more mini-CDs and three full-length albums were produced (out of which the first was never released officially).

Also in 1997, Marthus filled in as touring drummer for Czech bands Monastery, Pluggulp, Inner Fear, Happy Death and Scharnhorst.

In the years following (1997–2000) Marthus played live not only with Happy Death and Inner Fear, but also appeared as a guest drummer on Melancholy Pessimism mini-tour (2000), a project of Root singer Jiří "Big Boss" Valter, BigBoss and in 1999 recording CD of project Entrails (where he met Root guitar player, Petr "Blackie" Hošek).

In the beginning of 2001, Marthus took played drums in Pandemia, setting out on a spring European tour, after which he left the band.

In summer 2004, Marthus filmed his first drumming DVD and moved from Czech Republic to England.

In autumn 2004, Marthus joined English band Mantas (featuring Venom guitarist Jeff "Mantas" Dunn) and in summer 2005 started collaborating with Czech power/speed/symphonic metal band Symphonity (ex Nemesis).

In January 2006, Marthus recorded drums for a new Symphonity album at House of Audio studios in Germany.

In October 2006, Marthus joined English extreme metal band Cradle of Filth, replacing Adrian Erlandsson.

On 1 July 2012, it was announced that Marthus would join melodic power metal band Masterplan.

Marthus is also a songwriter and keyboard player. He wrote and recorded all the keyboards and orchestrations for the Cradle of Filth albums The Manticore and Other Horrors, Hammer Of The Witches, Cryptoriana – The Seductiveness of Decay and most of the keyboards and orchestration for Existence Is Futile. Marthus wrote the music for songs such as 'Right Wing Of The Garden Triptych' or 'Crawling King Chaos'.

Discography

Equipment
Marthus is endorsed by Pearl drums, Sabian cymbals, Vic Firth drum sticks, Remo drumheads and Serial Drummer clothing company.

Drums -Pearl Reference Series in Twilight Fade
8"×8" Tom
10"×8" Tom
12"×9" Tom
14"×12" Tom
16"×14" Tom
22"×18" Bass Drum (X2)
13"×6.5" Snare Drum
Cymbals – Sabian
21" HH Raw-Bell Dry Ride
13" AAX Fusion HiHats
14" AAX Stage HiHats
19" AAX Dark Crash
18" AAX Metal Crash
17" AAX Rock AAXtreme China
19" AAX Rock AAXtreme China
16" AAX Stage Crash
10" AA China Splash
10" AAX Splash
8" AAX Splash
9" Signature Max Splash
Drumheads – Remo
Toms – Emperor Clear
Bass Drums – Powerstroke
Snare – Ambassador Coated
Hardware – Pearl And Ddrum
Pearl P2000B Pedals
Ddrum 4 SE
Ddrum Kick Drum Triggers
Sticks – Vic Firth's SD4

References

External links
 Official Marthus Website
 Official Cradle Of Filth Website
 Official Masterplan Website
 Official Inner Fear Website
 Official Titanic (heavy metal Brno) Website
 Official Symphonity Website
 Official Happy Death Website
 Official Entrails Website

1981 births
Heavy metal drummers
Living people
Czech musicians
Cradle of Filth members
Czech drummers
Czech keyboardists
Masterplan (band) members
21st-century drummers
Czech heavy metal musicians